Kynnumboon is a locality in the Tweed Shire of New South Wales, Australia.

References

Localities in New South Wales
Tweed Shire